Beogradski košarkaški klub Radnički, commonly referred to as Radnički Beograd, is a men's basketball club based in Belgrade, Serbia. The club plays in the 3rd-tier First Regional League of Serbia. Their home arena is the SC Šumice.

History
The club was founded on 7 June 1945 in the Belgrade's neighborhood of Crveni Krst, which is where their nickname krstaši (the Crusaders) comes from. Radnički achieved the biggest success during the 1970s, when the generation coached by Slobodan Ivković won the title of Yugoslav League champion in 1973. The club also won a Yugoslav Cup in 1976, and reached another cup final in 1978.

During the 1970s, Radnički also had good results in continental competitions. In 1974, they reached the semi-finals of the FIBA European Champions Cup, where they were stopped by reigning European champions, Ignis Varese. In 1977, Radnički reached the finals of a FIBA European Cup Winners' Cup where they lost to Forst Cantù by a single point margin, 86–87.

Sponsorship naming
Radnički has had several denominations through the years due to its sponsorship:
Radnički FOB: N/A
Radnički LMK: N/A
Radnički CIP: 1996–1997
Radnički Jugopetrol: 1999–2002

Home arenas 
 Šumice Hall
 Slobodan Piva Ivković Hall (2000–present)

Players

Coaches

Head coaches 

  Miodrag Stefanović
  Ranko Žeravica (1954–1960)
  Dragoljub Pljakić (1965–1967)
  Slobodan Ivković (1967–1976)
  Milan Vasojević (1976–1977)
  Bratislav Đorđević (1979–1980)
  Božidar Maljković (1980–1982)
  Dušan Ivković (1982–1984)
  Marijan Novović (1985–1987)
  Slobodan Ivković (1989–1990)
  Zlatan Tomić (1990–1992)
  Dragoljub Pljakić (1992–1993)
  Slobodan Ivković (1993–1994)
  Jovica Antonić (1994–1995)
  Aleksandar Petrović
  Velimir Gašić (1997–1998)
  Rajko Toroman (1998–1999)
  Boško Đokić (1999)
  Duško Vujošević (1999–2001)
  Miroslav Nikolić (2001–2002)
  Dejan Srzić (2003–2004)
  Miodrag Rajković (2004–2005)
  Dragan Nikolić (2009–2012)
  Marko Ičelić (2012–2013)
  Milan Mitrović (2013)
  Branko Milisavljević (2015–2017)
  Goran Vučković (2018–2020)
  Nebojša Knežević (2020–2021)
  Marko Boltić (2021–present)

Hall of Famers and contributors
FIBA Hall of Fame

50 Greatest EuroLeague Contributors

Trophies and awards

Trophies
Yugoslav League (1st-tier; defunct)
 Winners (1): 1972–73
Yugoslav Cup (defunct)
 Winners (1): 1975–76
Yugoslav B League (2nd-tier; defunct)
Winner (1): 1983–84
Second League of Serbia (2nd-tier)
Winner (1): 2010–11
First Regional League of Serbia (3rd-tier)
Winner (2): 2009–10, 2018–19
FIBA Saporta Cup (defunct)
 Runners-up (1): 1976–77

Awards
FIBA European Cup Winners' Cup Finals Top Scorer
  Srećko Jarić (1) – 1977

Notable players

  Darko Balaban
  Nemanja Bezbradica
  Luka Bogdanović (youth)
  Petar Božić
  Dragutin Čermak
  Miroljub Damnjanović 
  Dušan Ivković
  Slobodan Ivković
  Srećko Jarić
  Ranko Žeravica
  Zoran Jovanović 
  Slađan Stojković
  Aleksandar Nađfeji
  Stevan Nađfeji
  Milovan Tasić
  Nemanja Đurić
  Luka Pavićević
  Dragoslav Ražnatović
  Dragiša Šarić
  Vanja Plisnić
  Dragi Ivković
  Milun Marović
  Dragan Vučinić
  Vladimir Dragutinović 
   Milan Tomić
  Aleksandar Čubrilo 
  Dušan Vukčević
  Goran Ćakić 
  Žarko Vučurović
   Dragan Tubak
  Marko Čakarević
  Mlađen Šljivančanin 
  Branko Sinđelić 
  Nikola Bjegović 
  Dušan Trivalić
  Dušan Zupančić
  Dragoljub Zmijanac
  Igor Perović
  Uroš Lučić
  Dušan Đorđević
  Bogdan Riznić
  Bogić Vujošević

International record

References

External links
 
 BKK Radnički at kls.rs
 BKK Radnički at eurobasket.com

 
Basketball teams in Yugoslavia
Basketball teams in Belgrade
Basketball teams established in 1945
Zvezdara